Dortmund's form improved during the 1998–99 season and they climbed to 4th, qualifying again for the Champions League.

Players

First-team squad
Squad at end of season

Left club during season

Competitions

Bundesliga

League table

References

Borussia Dortmund seasons
Borussia Dortmund